The Angren–Pop railway line is an electrified railway line in eastern Uzbekistan. It provides an additional transport line besides the Kamchik road pass, improving the connection between the Fergana Valley with the rest of Uzbekistan. The total cost of the project was $. The line opened on 22 June 2016. Passenger trains began operating on 1 September 2016.

The new rail allows Uzbekistan to abandon the Soviet-era line that cuts across Tajikistan's Sughd Region, saving Uzbekistan a reported $25 million in transit fees it pays to Tajikistan each year. The project cost an estimated US$1.9 billion and was built over five years. Construction began in March 2013. In September 2013, the China Railway Tunnel Group signed a construction contract worth $455 million.

The project was funded by the Uzbekistan government and international loans. In May 2014, the Export-Import Bank of China announced it would lend Uzbekistan US$350 million to fund the Chinese tunnel contract. In February 2015, the World Bank confirmed it would lend Uzbekistan US$195 million for the Angren–Pap Railway.

Uzbek Railways is responsible for the construction and China Railway Tunnel Group constructed the Qamchiq Tunnel.

References

External links

 Map of railway lines in the area

Railway lines in Uzbekistan
Railway lines opened in 2016